ITI or Iti may refer to:

Companies
 Indian Telephone Industries Limited, manufacturer of telecommunications equipment in India
 ITI Group, a media group in Poland
 ITI Records, a jazz record label in Van Nuys, California

Organizations
 Information Technology Industry Council, a U.S. trade association
 Institute of Translation & Interpreting, representing translators and interpreters in the U.K.
 International Tartan Index, database of the Scottish Tartans Authority
 International Theatre Institute, performing arts organization founded by UNESCO
 U.S.-ITI units and British-ITI units, Italian Army Service Units of World War II

Schools
 Industrial training institute, post-secondary schools in India
 Information Technology Institute, a postgraduate career institute in Egypt
 Intercultural Theatre Institute, actor-training school in Singapore
 International Theological Institute, a Catholic theological school in Austria

Think tanks
 Information Trust Institute, at University of Illinois at Urbana-Champaign, studies information security
 Infrastructure Technology Institute, a transportation research center at Northwestern University
 International Telugu Institute, established by the Government of Andhra Pradesh in 1975

Other uses
 Mount Iti, a mountain in Greece
 Iti (film), an Indian film